Hope Is a Thing With Feathers may refer to:

 "Hope" is the thing with feathers, a poem by American poet Emily Dickinson
 Hope Is a Thing with Feathers, a 2003 album by Trailer Bride
 Hope Is The Thing with Feathers, a 2000 non-fiction book about bird extinction by Christopher Cokinos